Ambohimanambola is a rural municipality in Analamanga Region, in the  Central Highlands of Madagascar. It belongs to the district of Antananarivo Avaradrano and its populations numbers to 16,418 in 2018.

Power stations
At 14km from Ambohimanambola is situated the Antelomita Hydroelectric Power Station.

References

The Rural Commune of Ambohimanambola

Populated places in Analamanga